Thurston Bay Marine Provincial Park is a provincial park on the northwest side of Sonora Island in British Columbia, Canada.

References

External links
Thurston Bay Marine Provincial Park
Map showing park location

Provincial parks of British Columbia
Provincial Parks of the Discovery Islands
Marine parks of Canada